The Singer from Mexico (French: Le Chanteur de Mexico) is a French-Spanish musical film directed by Richard Pottier  starring Luis Mariano and Bourvil, released in 1957. It was a screen version of Francis Lopez's operetta that premiered at the Théâtre du Châtelet on 15 December 1951. It was in a tradition of operetta films that stretched back to the early sound era.

It was shot at the Billancourt Studios and on location in Paris and Spain. The film's sets were designed by the art directors Sigfrido Burmann and Serge Piménoff.

Soundtrack
"Francis Lopez composed for Le Chanteur de Mexico one of his best scores in which the arias integrate well into the atmosphere of the action; the airs were rapidly on everybody's lips: Mexico, Rossignol, Acapulco, Il est un coin de France, Maïtechu, Quant on voit Paris d'en haut, Quant on est deux amis."

The operetta was revived in 2006 at the Théâtre du Châtelet with a cast that included Ismaël Jordi, Rossy de Palma, Jean Benguigui and Clotilde Courau.

Cast
 Luis Mariano as Miguel Morano/Vincent Etchebar
 Bourvil as Bilou
 Annie Cordy as Cri-Cri
 Tilda Thamar as Eva Marchal
 Fernando Rey as Cartoni
 Gisèle Grandpré as La Tornada
 Pauline Carton as Cri-Cri's Aunt
 Paul Faivre as Bidache
 Manolo Morán as Martínez 
 Jacques Angelvin as Le speaker du radio crochet
 Robert Dalban as Le portier du théâtre 
 Fernando Rey as Cartoni - l'impresario

References

External links

Films based on operettas
1957 films
Spanish musical films
French musical films
Films directed by Richard Pottier
1957 musical films
Films set in Paris
Films shot at Billancourt Studios
Operetta films
1950s French-language films
1950s French films
French-language Spanish films